McLendons Creek is a  long 4th order tributary to the Deep River in Moore County, North Carolina.  This creek is the only stream of this name in the United States.

Variant names
According to the Geographic Names Information System, it has also been known historically as:
Buck Creek

Course
McLendons Creek rises about 0.25 miles southeast of Elberta in Moore County and then flows northeast to join the Deep River about 1.5 miles southeast of Glendon, North Carolina.

Watershed
McLendons Creek drains  of area, receives about 48.6 in/year of precipitation, and has a wetness index of 407.24 and is about 60% forested.

See also
List of rivers of North Carolina

References

Rivers of North Carolina
Rivers of Moore County, North Carolina